John de Villiers (born 5 July 1956) is a South African cricketer. He played in twelve first-class and six List A matches for Boland from 1989/90 to 1992/93.

See also
 List of Boland representative cricketers

References

External links
 

1956 births
Living people
South African cricketers
Boland cricketers